André-Hippolyte Lemonnier (Paris, 1794–1871) was a French poet, essayist and traveler.

Biography 
Son of the painter Anicet Charles Gabriel Lemonnier, he completes legal studies and graduates in law at the University of Strasbourg in 1817 and becomes a lawyer.

He was secretary of the Academy of France in Rome from 1827 to 1831 and member of the Roman Academy of the Tiber. He published in 1832 Souvenirs d'Italie.

References

Bibliography

Other projects 

  Wikiquote contiene citazioni di o su André-Hippolyte Lemonnier
  Wikimedia Commons contiene immagini o altri file su André-Hippolyte Lemonnier 
Categoria:Voci con codice VIAF
Categoria:Voci con codice ISNI
Categoria:Voci con codice BNF
Categoria:Voci con codice WorldCat Identities
Categoria:Voci biografiche con codici di controllo di autorità

1794 births
1871 deaths
French poets
French explorers
French essayists